The Mustafa Kemal Atatürk Memorial is a monument to Mustafa Kemal Atatürk, founder of the Turkish Republic. It is located on Mustafa Kemal Atatürk Plaza in Beersheba, Israel.

History

The monument is located between the David Tuviyahu Avenue and the Ali Daivis Street on Mustafa Kemal Atatürk Plaza across from another memorial which is dedicated to the Ottoman Soldiers who fell in the Battle of Beersheba (1917). It is next to a memorial commemorating the Allied (Australian and New Zealand) soldiers.

The monument was unveiled in a ceremony in 2008. It was attended by Turkey's Tel Aviv ambassador Namık Tan and other embassy personnel and military attaches. Also the Beersheba mayor Yaakov Terner and the ambassadors of the United Kingdom, Australia, New Zealand, South Africa and many Turkish expatriates attended the ceremony. The ambassador expressed the importance of the Ottoman Empire in the history of Beersheba and that he was glad that the memorial had finally been realized.

References

Beersheba
Buildings and structures in Beersheba
Monuments and memorials in Israel